Frassinello Monferrato is a comune (municipality) in the Province of Alessandria in the Italian region Piedmont, located about  east of Turin and about  northwest of Alessandria.

Frassinello Monferrato borders the following municipalities: Camagna Monferrato, Cella Monte, Olivola, Ottiglio, Rosignano Monferrato, and Vignale Monferrato.

References

Cities and towns in Piedmont